Statistics Norway (abbreviated to SSB) is the Norwegian statistics bureau. It was established in 1876.

Relying on a staff of about 1,000, Statistics Norway publish about 1,000 new statistical releases every year on its web site. All releases are published both in Norwegian and English. In addition a number of edited publications are published, and all are available on the web site for free.

As the central Norwegian office for official government statistics, Statistics Norway provides the public and government with extensive research and analysis activities. It is administratively placed under the Ministry of Finance but operates independently from all government agencies. Statistics Norway has a board appointed by the government. It relies extensively on data from registers, but are also collecting data from surveys and questionnaires, including from cities and municipalities.

History
Statistics Norway was originally established in 1876. The Statistics Act of 1989 provides the legal framework for Statistics Norway's activities.

Leadership
The agency is led by a Director General. 
Geir Axelsen, Director General, (May 2018 - incumbent)
Birger Vikøren, acting Director General (autumn 2017 - May 2018)
Christine Meyer, Director General ( - autumn 2017). In the autumn of 2017 resigned from that position after Finance Minister Siv Jensen  declared that Meyer no longer had her confidence. The conflict was the question of how the Research Section should be organised.

References

External links

Government agencies of Norway
1876 establishments in Norway
Government agencies established in 1876
Norway